Eliezer Karpeles (1754, Prague – 27 April 1832, Libeň) was a Czech rabbi. For nearly forty years he was district rabbi of Kouřim, with residence at Libeň. Karpeles was the author of Me-Abne ha-Maḳom, novellæ, chiefly to Horayot and to some passages of Maimonides (Prague, 1801), and  'Erki 'Alai, notes to 'Arakin and Hullin (ib. 1815).

See also
 Karpeles

References 

1754 births
1832 deaths
18th-century Bohemian rabbis
19th-century Czech rabbis
Rabbis from Prague